The Forth and Clyde Canal is a canal opened in 1790, crossing central Scotland; it provided a route for the seagoing vessels of the day between the Firth of Forth and the Firth of Clyde at the narrowest part of the Scottish Lowlands. This allowed navigation from Edinburgh on the east coast to the port of Glasgow on the west coast.

Successful in its day, it suffered as the seagoing vessels were built larger and could no longer pass through. The railway age further impaired the success of the canal, and in the 1930s decline had ended in dormancy. The final decision to close the canal in the early 1960s was made due to maintenance costs of bridges crossing the canal exceeding the revenues it brought in. However, subsidies to the rail network were also a cause for its decline and the closure ended the movement of the east-coast Forth River fishing fleets across the country to fish the Irish Sea. The lack of political and financial foresight also removed a historical recreational waterway and potential future revenue generator to the town of Grangemouth. Unlike the majority of major canals the route through Grangemouth was drained and backfilled before 1967 to create a new carriageway for port traffic.

The M8 motorway in the eastern approaches to Glasgow took over some of the alignment of the canal, but more recent ideas have regenerated the utility of the canal for leisure use.

Geography

The eastern end of the canal is connected to the River Forth by a stretch of the River Carron near Grangemouth. The canal roughly follows the course of the Roman Antonine Wall and was the biggest infrastructure project in Scotland since then. The highest section of the canal passes close to Kilsyth and it is fed there by an aqueduct which gathers water from (the purpose built) Birkenburn Reservoir in the Kilsyth Hills, stored in another purpose-built reservoir called Townhead near Banton, from where it feeds the canal via a feeder from the Shawend Burn near Craigmarloch. The canal continues past Twechar, through Kirkintilloch and Bishopbriggs to the Maryhill area north of Glasgow city centre. A branch to Port Dundas was built to secure the agreement and financial support of Glasgow merchants who feared losing business if the canal bypassed them completely. This branch flows past Murano Street Student Village, halls of residence for the University of Glasgow. The western end of the canal connects to the River Clyde at Bowling.

In  1840, a  canal, the Forth and Cart Canal, was built to link the Forth and Clyde canal, at Whitecrook, to the River Clyde, opposite the mouth of the River Cart.

Origins
Priestley, writing in 1831, said:

The first act of parliament relating to this canal, received the royal assent on the 8th of March, 1768, and it is entitled, 'An Act for making and maintaining a navigable Canal from the Firth or River of Forth, at or near the mouth of the River Carron, in the county of Stirling, to the Firth or River of Clyde, at or near a place called Dalmuir Burnfoot, in the county of Dumbarton; and also a collateral Cut from the same to the city of Glasgow; and for making a navigable Cut or Canal of Communication from the Port or Harbour of Borrowstounness, to join the said Canal at or near the place where it will fall into the Firth of Forth.'
 
The subscribers were incorporated by the name of "The Company of Proprietors of the Forth and Clyde Navigation," with power to raise among themselves the sum of £150,000, in fifteen hundred shares of £100 each, and an additional sum of £50,000, if necessary.

At first there were difficulties with securing the capital for the work, but soon, thanks in the main to investment by Sir Lawrence Dundas, 1st Baronet, "the execution of this canal proceeded with such rapidity, under the direction of [the engineer] Mr. Smeaton, that in two years and three quarters from the date of the first act, one half of the work was finished; when, in consequence of some misunderstanding between him and the proprietors, he declined any further connection with the work, which was shortly afterwards let to contractors, who however failed, and the canal was again placed under the direction of its original projector, who brought it to within  of its proposed junction with the Clyde, when the work was stopped in 1775 for want of funds, and it continued at a stand for several years."

Numerous supplementary Acts of Parliament preceded this period and more followed, but the key to unlocking the problem was some creativity, in which "the Barons of the Court of Exchequer in Scotland, are, out of the money arising from the sale of forfeited estates, directed to lend the Forth and Clyde Navigation Company the sum of £50,000, by which they were enabled to resume their labours, under the direction of Mr. Robert Whitworth, an engineer possessing a well earned reputation". The work was completed on 28 July 1790.

The Forth and Clyde Navigation Committee was set up in Glasgow in (or before) 1787 and had several notable members: John Riddel (Lord Provost of Glasgow); John Campbell of Clathick; Patrick Colquhoun (Convenor and Superintendent); Robert Whitworth (engineer); Archibald Spiers; John Cumine (as collector of fees at east end) and James Loudon (as collector of fees at west end).

Contemporary description
Priestley wrote in 1831,

Besides the fine rivers above-mentioned [the Forth and Clyde, the canal], is joined by the Edinburgh and Glasgow Union Canal, near Falkirk; with the Monkland and Kirkintilloch Railway at its summit, near the last-mentioned village; and with the Monkland Canal and the Garnkirk and Glasgow Railway, at Port Dundas, near the city of Glasgow.

This magnificent canal commences in the River Forth, in Grangemouth Harbour, and near to where the Carron empties itself into that river. Its course is parallel with the Carron, and in nearly a westwardly direction, passing to the north of the town of Falkirk, and thence to Red Bridge, where it quits the county of Stirling, and enters a detached portion of the shire of Dumbarton. The remaining part of the line is in a westwardly direction, crossing the Kelvin River by a noble aqueduct, and thence to the Clyde, into which, after running parallel with it for some distance, it locks down at Bowling's Bay, near Dalmuir Burnfoot.

The branch to the Monkland Canal at Glasgow is two miles and three quarters []; and there is another cut into the Carron River, at Carron Shore, in order to communicate with the Carron Iron Works.

Though this canal was originally constructed for vessels drawing , yet by recent improvements, sea-borne craft of  draught may now pass through it, from the Irish Sea to the German Ocean.

Passenger traffic

Between 1789 and 1803 the canal was used for trials of William Symington's steamboats, culminating in the Charlotte Dundas, the "first practical steamboat" built at the shipyard in Grangemouth by Alexander Hart.

Passenger boats ran on the canal from 1783, and in 1809 fast boats were introduced, running from Edinburgh to Falkirk in 3 hours 30 minutes, providing such comforts as food, drink and newspapers. By 1812 they carried 44,000 passengers, taking receipts of more than £3,450.

From 1828 there was a steamboat service, operated by Thomas Grahame's boat Cupid.

Construction
The canal was designed by John Smeaton.  Construction started in 1768 and after delays due to funding problems was completed in 1790. To mark the opening a hogshead of water taken from the Forth was emptied into the Clyde at Bowling to symbolise the union of the eastern and western seas. The geologist James Hutton became very involved in the canal between 1767 and 1774; he contributed his geological knowledge, made extended site inspections, and acted both as a shareholder and as a member of the management committee. The Union Canal was then constructed to link the eastern end of the canal to Edinburgh.

Changes of ownership

In 1842 an Act of Parliament was obtained authorising the Caledonian Railway to take over the Forth and Clyde Canal along with the Forth and Cart Canal, although this did not take effect until 1867.

In the meantime the canal company itself had built a railway branch line to Grangemouth Dock, which it owned.

The canal was nationalised in 1948, along with the railway companies, and control passed to the British Transport Commission. In 1962, the British Transport Commission was wound up, and control passed to the British Waterways Board; subsequently Scottish Canals took control.

Run down and revival
In 1963 the canal was closed rather than construct a motorway crossing, and so it became disused and semi-derelict. Canal locks in the Falkirk area on the Union Canal near the connection to the Forth and Clyde canal had been filled in and built over in the 1930s.

As part of the millennium celebrations in 2000, National Lottery funds were used to regenerate both canals. A boatlifting device, the Falkirk Wheel, was built to connect the two canals and once more allow boats to travel from the Clyde or Glasgow to Edinburgh, with a new canal connection to the River Carron and hence the River Forth. The Falkirk Wheel opened on 27 May 2002 and is now a tourist attraction.

When the canal was reopened, the Port Dundas branch was reinstated from Stockingfield Junction, where it leaves the main line, to Speirs Wharf, where further progress was blocked by culverts created as part of the M8 Motorway construction and the abortive Maryhill Motorway. The project cost £5.6 million, and the first lock and intermediate basin were opened on 29 September 2006. The lock was named Speaker Martin's Lock, after Michael Martin MP, the speaker in the House of Commons who performed the opening ceremony. Opening of the second lock was delayed by a dispute over land ownership.

Forth and Clyde Canal Society
The Forth and Clyde Canal Society is a waterway society on the Forth and Clyde Canal in the central lowlands of Scotland. It was formed in 1980 to "campaign for the Forth and Clyde's preservation, restoration and development"

According to the Forth and Clyde Canal Society's website, their current aim is "To promote the canal and to ensure its success".

The Society's campaigning included a petition of over 30,000 signatures for the reopening of the canal, which was then put in place under the  Millennium Link project which commenced work in 1999.

The society currently has three boats which are used as trip-boats, charter vessels and for members cruises along the canal.

Locks
There are 39 locks on the Forth & Clyde Canal, as follows:

1 – New River Carron Sea Lock (The Helix Canal Extension – beyond The Kelpies)
2 – Basin Moorings (Sea Lock)
3 – Carron Cut Lock
4 – Abbotshaugh Lock
5 – Bainsford Lock
6 – Grahamston Iron Works Lock
7 – Merchiston Lock
8 – Merers Lock
9 – Camelon Railway Lock
10 – Camelon Lock
11 – Rosebank Lock
12 – Camelon Lock No. 12
13 – Camelon Lock No. 13
14 – Camelon Lock No. 14
15 – Falkirk Wheel
16 – Falkirk Bottom Lock No. 16
17 – Underwood Lock No. 17
18 – Allandale Lock No. 18
19 – Castlecary Lock No. 19
20 – Wyndford Lock No. 20 (summit level)
21 – Maryhill Top Lock No. 21 (summit level)
22 – Maryhill Lock
23 – Maryhill Lock
24 – Maryhill Lock
25 – Maryhill Bottom Lock No. 25
26 – Kelvindale  (Temple Lock No. 26)
27 – Temple Lock No. 27
28 – Cloberhill Top Lock No. 28
29 – Cloberhill Middle Lock No. 29
30 – Cloberhill Bottom Lock No. 30
31 – Cloberhill Lock No. 31
32 – Cloberhill Lock No. 32
33 – Boghouse Top Lock No. 33
34 – Boghouse Middle Lock No. 34
35 – Boghouse Lower Lock. 35
36 –  No. 36
Drop Lock – Dalmuir Drop Lock (constructed recently to take navigation below bridge)
37 – Old Kilpatrick
38 – Dalnottar Lock No. 37
39 – Bowling Lock No. 38

The overall ruling dimensions are length: ; beam: ; draught: ; headroom: , but at the western end larger vessels may use the Bowling basin.

Data sourced from www.scottishcanals.co.uk

See also

Auchinstarry and its new basin, a £1.2M regeneration project
 Forth to Firth Canal Pathway
 Forth and Cart Canal
 Falkirk Helix
 John Muir Way
 World Canals Conference
 Donald's Quay
 Canal Safety Gates
 Stockingfield Junction

Footnotes

Further reading

 Lindsay, Jean. The Canals of Scotland. Newton Abbot: David & Charles, 1968.
 Brown, Hamish. Exploring the Edinburgh to Glasgow Canals. London: Stationery Office, 1997.
 Macneill, John. Canal Navigation: On the Resistance of Water to the Passage of Boats Upon Canals and Other Bodies of Water, Being the Results of Experiments. London: Roake and Varty, 1833.—See: Appendix A.
 Mouton, H.G. "The Forth and Clyde Ship Canal," Journal of Political Economy, vol. 18, no. 9 (Nov. 1910), pp. 736–741. In JSTOR

External links

Glasgow's Canals Unlocked, tourism publication by Scottish Canals
Environmental Advisory Service case study on Auchinstarry Basin
The  Forth & Clyde and Union Canals
The Scotland Guide: Glasgow, The Forth and Clyde Canal – surveying the canal
Falkirk Wheel
The Falkirk Wheel – The Forth and Clyde Canal
History of the Forth and Clyde Canal – Clyde Waterfront Heritage
National Library of Scotland: SCOTTISH SCREEN ARCHIVE (archive films about the Forth and Clyde Canal)
Video footage of the Stockingfield Junction WWII 'Stop or Safety gate'.
Video footage of Stockingfield Junction.
Video footage of Ferrydyke Quay and Bascule Bridge
Video footage of Auchintarry Marina
Video footage of the Dalmuir Drop Lock
images & map of mile markers seen along the Forth & Clyde canal

Canals opened in 1790
18th century in Scotland
Canals in Scotland
Historic Civil Engineering Landmarks
Scheduled monuments in Scotland
Transport in Falkirk (council area)
Transport in East Dunbartonshire
Transport in Glasgow
Transport in West Dunbartonshire
Kirkintilloch
Scottish Canals
1790 establishments in Scotland
Bishopbriggs
Clydebank
Bearsden
Falkirk
Grangemouth
Maryhill
Scottish Lowlands